Snyder v. Phelps, 562 U.S. 443 (2011), was a landmark decision by the Supreme Court of the United States in which the Court held that speech made in a public place on a matter of public concern cannot be the basis of liability for a tort of emotional distress, even if the speech is viewed as offensive or outrageous.

On March 10, 2006, seven members of the Westboro Baptist Church (WBC), led by the church's founder Fred Phelps, picketed the funeral of U.S. Marine Matthew Snyder, who was killed in a non-combat accident during the Iraq War. On public land about 1,000 feet from where the funeral was being held, protesters displayed placards that read "Thank God for Dead Soldiers", "God Hates Fags", and "You're Going to Hell", among others. Snyder's father, Albert Snyder, filed a lawsuit seeking damages from Phelps and the Westboro Baptist Church, claiming that their picketing was meant to intentionally inflict emotional distress. Phelps defended the picketing as an appropriate use of their right to free speech and right to peacefully protest as granted by the First Amendment to the U.S. Constitution.

The District Court of Maryland ruled in favor of Snyder and awarded him a total of $10.9 million in damages, but the Fourth Circuit Court of Appeals reversed, holding that the protesters' signs were "rhetorical hyperbole" and "figurative expression" and were therefore protected speech under the First Amendment. On appeal to the U.S. Supreme Court, the Court ruled in favor of Phelps, holding that speech made in a public place on a matter of public concern cannot be the basis for a claim of tort liability for intentional infliction of emotional distress. In an 8–1 decision delivered by Chief Justice John Roberts, the Court wrote that the First Amendment "shield[s] Westboro from tort liability for its picketing" because the speech was made on a matter of public concern and did not disrupt the funeral.

Background

Facts of the case
The Westboro Baptist Church (WBC), often labeled as a hate group, was founded by Fred Phelps in 1955 and is headquartered in Topeka, Kansas. The congregation consists of about "sixty or seventy members", the majority of them being Phelps's children, grandchildren, relatives, and in-laws. Since Westboro's founding, members of the church have picketed hundreds of military funerals "to communicate its belief that God hates the United States for its tolerance of homosexuality, particularly in America’s military".

On March 3, 2006, Matthew Snyder, a Lance Corporal of the United States Marine Corps, was killed in a non-combat-related vehicle accident in the Anbar Province of Iraq during Operation Iraqi Freedom. Shortly after in Snyder's hometown of Westminster, Maryland, his parents Albert and Julie Snyder were informed of his death by two Marines. Snyder's death was announced in local newspapers on March 7, and his funeral time and location was announced in The Baltimore Sun on March 8. The Westboro Baptist Church issued a press release on March 8 stating that they learned of Snyder's death and that members of the church planned to travel from Kansas to Maryland in order to picket Snyder's funeral, which was set for March 10 at St. John's Catholic Church in Westminster.

On March 10, as Snyder's funeral was being held, picketers located approximately 1,000 feet away from the church on public land displayed placards such as "Thank God for Dead Soldiers", "Thank God for IEDs", "God Hates Fags", "Fag Troops", "America is Doomed", "God Hates the USA/Thank God for 9/11", "Pope in Hell", "Priests Rape Boys", "Don't Pray for the USA", and "You're Going to Hell". Members of the Patriot Guard Riders, a group of motorcyclists who separate WBC protesters from those who attend military funerals, were present in support of the Snyder family. WBC published statements on their website that denounced Albert Snyder and his ex-wife for raising their son Catholic, stating they "taught Matthew to defy his Creator", "raised him for the devil", and "taught him that God was a liar".

District Court of Maryland
Albert Snyder, Matthew Snyder's father, sued Fred Phelps, Westboro Baptist Church, and two of Phelps's daughters, Rebekah Phelps-Davis and Shirley Phelps-Roper, for defamation, intrusion upon seclusion, publicity given to private life, intentional infliction of emotional distress, and civil conspiracy. The claim of defamation arising from comments posted about Snyder on the WBC website was dismissed, on the grounds that the contents were "essentially Phelps-Roper's religious opinion and would not realistically tend to expose the Plaintiff to public hatred or scorn". The claim of publicity given to private life was similarly dismissed since no private information was made public by the Defendants: the WBC learned that Snyder was divorced and his son was Catholic from his son's newspaper obituary. The case proceeded to trial on the remaining three counts.

The facts of the case were essentially undisputed at trial and Albert Snyder testified:

Snyder described his emotional injuries as: becoming tearful, angry, and physically nauseated to the point that he would vomit. He stated that the Defendants had placed a "bug" in his head, so that he was unable to think of his son without thinking of their actions, adding, "I want so badly to remember all the good stuff and so far, I remember the good stuff, but it always turns into the bad". Snyder called several expert witnesses who testified that worsening of his diabetes and severe depression had resulted from the Defendants' activities.

In their defense, WBC established that they had complied with all local ordinances and had obeyed police instructions. The picket was held in a location cordoned off by the police, approximately 1000 feet (300 m) from the church, from which it could be neither seen nor heard. Mr. Snyder testified that, although he glimpsed the tops of the signs from the funeral procession, he did not see their content until he watched a news program on television later that day. He also indicated that he had found the WBC's statements about his son on their webpage from a Google search.

In his instructions to the jury, Judge Richard D. Bennett for the United States District Court for the District of Maryland stated that the First Amendment protection of free speech has limits, including vulgar, offensive and shocking statements, and that the jury must decide "whether the defendant's actions would be highly offensive to a reasonable person, whether they were extreme and outrageous and whether these actions were so offensive and shocking as to not be entitled to First Amendment protection". WBC unsuccessfully sought a mistrial based on alleged prejudicial statements made by the judge and violations of the gag order by the plaintiff's attorney. An appeal was also sought by the WBC.

On October 31, 2007, the jury found for the Plaintiff and awarded Snyder $2,900,000 in compensatory damages, later adding a decision to award $6,000,000 in punitive damages for invasion of privacy and an additional $2,000,000 for causing emotional distress (a total of ). The Phelpses said that despite the verdict, the church would continue to picket military funerals. On February 4, 2008, Bennett upheld the verdict but reduced the punitive damages from $8 million to $2.1 million, to take into consideration the resources of WBC. Court liens were ordered on church buildings and Phelps' law office in an attempt to ensure that the damages were paid.

Court of Appeals for the Fourth Circuit
An appeal by WBC was heard on September 24, 2009. The United States Court of Appeals for the Fourth Circuit reversed the jury verdict and set aside the lower court's $5 million judgment. The Fourth Circuit ruled that the lower court had erred by instructing the jury to decide a question of law rather than fact (specifically, whether or not the speech in question was protected by the First Amendment). The Fourth Circuit also ruled that the protest signs and language on WBC's website were rhetorical hyperbole and figurative expression, rather than assertions of fact, so they were a form of protected speech. On March 30, 2010, the Court further ordered Albert Snyder to pay the court costs for the defendants, an amount totaling $16,510. People all over the country, including political commentator Bill O'Reilly agreed to cover the costs, pending appeal. O'Reilly also pledged to support all of Snyder's future court costs against the Phelps family.

Final appeal

A writ of certiorari was filed by Snyder. The Supreme Court granted certiorari on March 8, 2010. Arguments were heard on October 6, represented by Phelps' daughter, Margie Phelps.

Supreme Court 
Several news and civil rights organizations filed amicus briefs in support of Phelps, including the American Civil Liberties Union, the Reporters Committee for Freedom of the Press, and twenty-one other media organizations, including National Public Radio, Bloomberg L.P., the Associated Press, the Newspaper Association of America, and others.

Other briefs were filed in favor of Snyder, including one by Senate Majority and Minority Leaders Mitch McConnell and Harry Reid, and forty other members of the United States Senate. A number of veterans groups, including the Veterans of Foreign Wars 
and the American Legion,
the John Marshall Veterans Legal Support Center and Clinic, and another by Kansas which was joined by District of Columbia and every other State except Delaware and Maine.

Opinion of the Court 
In an 8–1 decision the Supreme Court ruled in favor of Phelps, upholding the Fourth Circuit's decision. Chief Justice John Roberts (as in the Stevens case) wrote the majority opinion stating "What Westboro said, in the whole context of how and where it chose to say it, is entitled to 'special protection' under the First Amendment and that protection cannot be overcome by a jury finding that the picketing was outrageous."

The court's opinion also stated that the memorial service was not disturbed, saying, "Westboro stayed well away from the memorial service, Snyder could see no more than the tops of the picketers' signs, and there is no indication that the picketing interfered with the funeral service itself." The decision also declined to expand the "captive audience doctrine", saying that Snyder was not in a state where he was coerced to hear the negative speech.

Justice Stephen Breyer wrote a concurring opinion, emphasizing his view that the decision related only to picketing, and did not take into consideration Westboro Baptist Church's on-line publications that attacked the Snyder family.

Alito's dissent 
Justice Samuel Alito was the lone dissenting justice in this case, beginning his dissent with, "Our profound national commitment to free and open debate is not a license for the vicious verbal assault that occurred in this case." He sternly criticized the Church's conduct writing:

He concluded, "In order to have a society in which public issues can be openly and vigorously debated, it is not necessary to allow the brutalization of innocent victims like petitioner."

In a July 2011 speech, Justice Ginsburg called Alito's dissent "heart-felt" and said that it "underscored the incomparable distress suffered by the Snyder family," noting that "although no member of the Court joined him, his opinion aligned with the views of many Court-watchers, including one of the nation's newest—retired Justice Stevens, [who] recently told the Federal Bar Council he 'would have joined [Justice Alito's] powerful dissent'." Justice John Paul Stevens had retired in 2010.

Subsequent developments 
In 2014, Albert Snyder revealed in an interview with Politico that he is gay, and was in a long-term relationship with a man named Walt Fisher at the time of Matthew Snyder's funeral and resulting trial. Fisher died of complications from lung cancer in 2011, ten weeks after the Supreme Court ruled on Snyder v. Phelps.

See also 

 Fighting words
 First Amendment to the United States Constitution
 Fred Phelps
 Freedom of speech
 Gertz v. Robert Welch, Inc.
 Hustler Magazine v. Falwell
 Intentional infliction of emotional distress
 List of United States Supreme Court cases, volume 562
 Miller test
 New York Times Co. v. Sullivan
 Rowan v. U.S. Post Office Dept.

Notes

References

External links 

 
 Docket No. 09-751; Albert Snyder v. Fred W. Phelps Sr., et al on Supreme Court website
 Oral Argument Transcripts and audio
 SCOTUSBlog wiki on Snyder v. Phelps
 Oral Arguments on Oyez.org
 Archive of Snyder v. Phelps coverage from Albert Snyder's hometown newspaper

United States Supreme Court cases
2011 in United States case law
Anti-LGBT sentiment
History of LGBT civil rights in the United States
United States Supreme Court cases of the Roberts Court
United States Free Speech Clause case law
Westboro Baptist Church